Cell Calcium is a monthly peer-reviewed scientific journal published by Elsevier that covers the field of cell biology and focuses mainly on calcium signalling and metabolism in living organisms.

Abstracting and indexing 
The journal is abstracted and indexed in:

According to the Journal Citation Reports, Cell Calcium has a 2020 impact factor of 6.817.

References

External links 
 

Elsevier academic journals
Molecular and cellular biology journals
Monthly journals
Publications established in 1980
English-language journals